24 teams competed in the 2010 FIVB Volleyball Men's World Championship, with two places allocated for the hosts, Italy and the titleholder, Brazil. In the qualification process for the 2010 FIVB World Championship, the Five FIVB confederations were allocated a share of the 22 remaining spots.

Qualified teams

1.Competed as Soviet Union from 1949 to 1990; 5th appearance as Russia.
2.Competed as West Germany from 1956 to 1966; 3rd appearance as Germany.
3.Competed as SFR Yugoslavia from 1956 to 1970 and Serbia and Montenegro (FR Yugoslavia) from 1998 to 2006; 1st appearance as Serbia.
4.Competed as Czechoslovakia from 1949 to 1990; 4th appearance as Czech Republic.

Confederation qualification processes
The distribution by confederation for the 2010 FIVB Volleyball Men's World Championship was:

 Asia and Oceania (AVC): 4 places
 Africa (CAVB): 3 places
 Europe (CEV): 8 places (+ Italy qualified automatically as host nation for a total of 9 places)
 South America (CSV) 2 places (+ Brazil qualified automatically as the defending champions for a total of 3 places)
 North America (NORCECA): 5 places

AVC

  (Third Round)
  (First Round, Second Round)
  (Third Round)
  (Second Round)
  (First Round)
  (Second Round, Third Round)
  (Second Round)
  (Second Round, Third Round)
  (Third Round)
  (Second Round, Third Round)
  (First Round)
  (First Round)
  (First Round)
  (First Round, Second Round)
  (First Round, Second Round)
  (First Round, Second Round)
  (First Round)
  (Third Round)
  (First Round, Second Round)
  (Second Round, Third Round)
  (First Round, Second Round)

CAVB

  (Second Round, Third Round)
  (Third Round)
  (Third Round)
  (Third Round)
  (Third Round)
  (Second Round)
  (Second Round, Third Round)
  (Second Round, Third Round)
  (Second Round, Third Round)
  (Second Round, Third Round)
  (Third Round)
  (Third Round)
  (Second Round, Third Round)

CEV

  (First Round)
  (First Round)
  (First Round)
  (First Round, Second Round)
  (Second Round, Third Round)
  (First Round)
  (Third Round)
  (Second Round)
  (Second Round, Third Round)
  (Second Round)
  (Second Round, Third Round)
  (Second Round, Third Round)
  (Third Round)
  (Second Round, Third Round)
  (First Round)
  (Second Round)
  (First Round)
  (First Round)
  (First Round, Second Round)
  (First Round)
  (First Round, Second Round)
  (Second Round, Third Round)
  (First Round)
  (Third Round)
  (Second Round, Third Round)
  (First Round, Second Round, Third Round)
  (Third Round)
  (Third Round)
  (Second Round, Third Round)
  (Second Round, Third Round)
  (Third Round)
  (First Round)
  (Second Round)
  (Second Round)

CSV

  (Third Round)
  (Third Round)
  (Third Round)
  (Third Round)
  (Third Round)
  (Third Round)
  (Third Round)
  (Third Round)

NORCECA

  (First Round)
  (First Round, Second Round)
  (Second Round)
  (Second Round, Third Round)
  (Third Round)
  (Second Round)
  (First Round)
  (First Round)
  (Third Round, Playoff Round)
  (Second Round)
  (Second Round)
  (Third Round)
  (First Round)
  (Third Round, Playoff Round)
  (Second Round)
  (First Round)
  (Second Round, Third Round)
  (Second Round)
  (Second Round)
  (Second Round)
  (Second Round, Third Round, Playoff Round)
  (First Round)
  (Second Round)
  (Second Round)
  (Second Round, Third Round, Playoff Round)
  (Third Round)
  (First Round)
  (First Round, Second Round)
  (First Round)
  (Second Round, Third Round)
  (Second Round)
  (Second Round, Third Round)
  (Third Round)

References

External links
FIVB

2010 FIVB Volleyball Men's World Championship
FIVB Volleyball World Championship qualification